Staša Gejo (born 25 November 1997 in Niš) is a Serbian sport climber. She was the 2015 World Junior Champion in both bouldering and combined scoring. In the senior category she won the 2017 World Games in bouldering. She was the 2017 European champion in bouldering and came in third in combined scoring. In 2018 and 2021 she came in third at the world championships in bouldering.

Rankings

Climbing World Cup

Climbing World Championships 
Youth

Adult

Climbing European Championships 
Youth

Adult

References

External links 

1997 births
Living people
Female climbers
Serbian mountain climbers
Competitors at the 2017 World Games
European champions for Serbia
World Games gold medalists
IFSC Climbing World Championships medalists
Boulder climbers